N-Feruloylserotonin an alkaloid and polyphenol found in safflower seed.  Chemically, it is an amide formed between serotonin and ferulic acid.  It has in vitro anti-atherogenic activity.

Serotonin Derivatives Found in Safflower Seeds 

N-feruloyl serotonin and N-(p-coumaroyl)serotonin are natural products that can be found in the extract of safflower seeds (Carthamus tinctorius ). These natural products have been isolated and studied to investigate their antioxidant effects. These polyphenols have been utilized in traditional Chinese medicine and other eastern medicine practices to have strong antioxidant effects, chemotherapeutic effects, and atherosclerosis attenuation. It has been found that N-(p-coumaroyl) and N- feruloyl serotonin can suppress the expression of matrix metalloproteinases MMP3/13 and a disintegrin and metalloproteinase with thrombospondin motifs (ADAMTS), thus attenuating cartilage degradation.

Biosynthesis
  
The biosynthetic pathway of N- feruloyl serotonin and N-(p-coumaroyl) serotonin has been reported. In plants, the enzyme anthranilate synthase (AS) is composed of two subunits that modulate the production or suppression of tryptophan from chorismate. Tryptophan is then decarboxylated by tryptophan decarboxylase (TDC) into tryptamine. Tryptamine 5-hydroxylase (T5H) then hydroxylates tryptamine into serotonin. Serotonin, the precursor to N-(p-coumaroyl) and N- feruloyl serotonin, is found in the seeds of the safflower plant. Hydroxycinnamic acids are then transferred to serotonin from hydroxycinnamoyl-CoA esters by hydroxycinnamoyl-CoA: serotonin N-(hydroxycinnamoyl)transferase (SHT).

References 

Serotonin
Tryptamines